The MacDougall-Walker Correctional Institution is a Level 4 & 5 (high & maximum) security level multi-mission facility for adult males, in Suffield, Connecticut. Based on its inmates population, it is the largest correctional facility in New England. It came into being on May 15, 2001, as the result of the merge between the Walker Reception and Special Management Unit and the MacDougall Correctional Institution. Combined the facility resides on 140 acres.

The Staff & Inmates Population consists of (as of January 1, 2013):
Accused: 264
Sentenced: 1,785
Total: 2,049
Staff: 678

Notable Inmates
 Lorne J. Acquin - Mass Murderer.
 Richard Crafts - Woodchipper Murderer.
 Jesse Velez - Pedophile featured on Hansen vs Predator.

References

Prisons in Connecticut
2001 establishments in Connecticut
Buildings and structures in Hartford County, Connecticut